Birds Flying Away is the second album by Mason Jennings. It was released in January 2000 by the label Bar/None.

While writing this album, the drummer Chris Stock left and was replaced. Jennings had another setback for six months when he contracted mononucleosis, which delayed the release of the album.

Jennings is compared to Dave Matthews in a New York Times review.  Unlike the debut, the album included several songs with political themes.

Critical reception
City Pages called Birds Flying Away Jennings's best album, in a 2016 ranking, writing that "his blend of acoustic storytelling, historical themes, and funky instrumentation (there’s an alto-saxophone solo on the politically/historically charged 'Black Panther') makes for a perfect mix."

Track listing 
 "Confidant" - 3:47
 "United States Global Empire" - 3:02
 "Ballad for My One True Love" - 4:32
 "Black Panther" - 3:58
 "Dr. King" - 3:24
 "Stars Shine Quietly" - 3:49
 "Birds Flying Away" - 3:13
 "The Mountain" - 4:15
 "Duluth" - 3:03
 "Train Leaving Gray" - 2:20
 "The Light" - 4:23

Personnel 
 Mason Jennings - guitar, vocals, producer
 Bob Skoro - bass guitar, vocals, assistant producer
 Edgar Oliveria - drums
 Chris Thompson - alto saxophone
 Dave Gardner - mastering
 Ed Ackerson - producer, engineer
 Tom Garneau - engineer
 Camron Wittig - design, photography

References

External links 
 Discography

2000 albums
Mason Jennings albums